Volker may refer to:

 Volker (name), including a list of people with the given name or surname
 Volker, Kansas City, a historic neighborhood in Kansas City
 Volker Boulevard, Kansas City
 Alien Nations (German: Die Völker), a real-time strategy video game released in 1999

See also
 VolkerWessels, a Dutch construction company
 VolkerRail, a railway infrastructure services company based in Doncaster, England, owned by VolkerWessels
 Voelcker (disambiguation) 
 Voelker (disambiguation)